The Franciscans are a group of related mendicant Christian religious orders within the Catholic Church. Founded in 1209 by Italian Catholic friar Francis of Assisi, these orders include three independent orders for men (the Order of Friars Minor being the largest contemporary male order), orders for women religious such as the Order of Saint Clare, and the Third Order of Saint Francis open to male and female members. They adhere to the teachings and spiritual disciplines of the founder and of his main associates and followers, such as Clare of Assisi, Anthony of Padua, and Elizabeth of Hungary. Several smaller Protestant Franciscan orders exist as well, notably in the Anglican and Lutheran traditions (e.g. the Community of Francis and Clare).

Francis began preaching around 1207 and traveled to Rome to seek approval from Pope Innocent III in 1209 to form a new religious order. The original Rule of Saint Francis approved by the Pope did not allow ownership of property, requiring members of the order to beg for food while preaching. The austerity was meant to emulate the life and ministry of Jesus Christ. Franciscans traveled and preached in the streets, while staying in church properties. Clare of Assisi, under Francis's guidance, founded the Poor Clares (Order of Saint Clare) of the Franciscans.

The extreme poverty required of members was relaxed in the final revision of the Rule in 1223. The degree of observance required of members remained a major source of conflict within the order, resulting in numerous secessions. The Order of Friars Minor, previously known as the "Observant" branch, is one of the three Franciscan First Orders within the Catholic Church, the others being the "Conventuals" (formed 1517) and "Capuchins" (1520). The Order of Friars Minor, in its current form, is the result of an amalgamation of several smaller orders completed in 1897 by Pope Leo XIII. The latter two, the Capuchin and Conventual, remain distinct religious institutes within the Catholic Church, observing the Rule of Saint Francis with different emphases. Conventual Franciscans are sometimes referred to as minorites or greyfriars because of their habit. In Poland and Lithuania they are known as Bernardines, after Bernardino of Siena, although the term elsewhere refers to Cistercians instead.

Name and demographics

The name of the original order,  (Friars Minor, literally 'Order of Lesser Brothers') stems from Francis of Assisi's rejection of luxury and wealth. Francis was the son of a rich cloth merchant, but gave up his wealth to pursue his faith more fully. He had cut all ties that remained with his family, and pursued a life living in solidarity with his fellow brothers in Christ. In other words, he abandoned his life among the wealthy and aristocratic classes (or Majori) to live like the poor and peasants (minori). Francis adopted the simple tunic worn by peasants as the religious habit for his order, and had others who wished to join him do the same. Those who joined him became the original Order of Friars Minor.

First Order
The First Order or the Order of Friars Minor are commonly called simply the Franciscans. This order is a mendicant religious order of men, some of whom trace their origin to Francis of Assisi. Francis thus referred to his followers as "Fraticelli", meaning "Little Brothers". Franciscan brothers are informally called friars or the Minorites.

The modern organization of the Friars Minor comprises three separate families or groups, each considered a religious order in its own right under its own minister General and particular type of governance. They all live according to a body of regulations known as the Rule of Saint Francis.
 The Order of Friars Minor, also known as the Observants, are most commonly simply called Franciscan friars, official name: Friars Minor (OFM).
 The Order of Friars Minor Capuchin or simply Capuchins, official name: Friars Minor Capuchin (OFM Cap.).
 The Order of Friars Minor Conventual or simply Minorites, official name: Friars Minor Conventual (OFM Conv.).

Second Order
The Second Order, most commonly called Poor Clares in English-speaking countries, consists of only one branch of religious sisters. The order is called the Order of St. Clare (OSC), but prior to 1263 they were called "The Poor Ladies", "The Poor Enclosed Nuns", and "The Order of San Damiano".

Third Order
The Franciscan third order, known as the Third Order of Saint Francis, has many men and women members, separated into two main branches:
 The Secular Franciscan Order, OFS, originally known as the Brothers and Sisters of Penance or Third Order of Penance, try to live the ideals of the movement in their daily lives outside of religious institutes.
 Members of the Third Order Regular (TOR) live in religious communities under the traditional religious vows. They grew out of the Secular Franciscan Order.

The 2013  gave the following figures for the membership of the principal male Franciscan orders:.
 Order of Friars Minor (OFM): 2,212 communities; 14,123 members; 9,735 priests
 Franciscan Order of Friars Minor Conventual (OFM Conv.): 667 communities; 4,289 members; 2,921 priests
 Franciscan Order of Friars Minor Capuchin (OFM Cap.): 1,633 communities; 10,786 members; 7,057 priests
 Third Order Regular of Saint Francis (TOR): 176 communities; 870 members; 576 priests

The coat of arms that is a universal symbol of Franciscan "contains the Tau cross, with two crossed arms: Christ’s right hand with the nail wound and Francis’ left hand with the stigmata wound."

History

Beginnings
A sermon Francis heard in 1209 on Matthew 10:9 made such an impression on him that he decided to devote himself wholly to a life of apostolic poverty. Clad in a rough garment, barefoot, and, after the Evangelical precept, without staff or scrip, he began to preach repentance.

He was soon joined by a prominent fellow townsman, Bernard of Quintavalle, who contributed all that he had to the work, and by other companions, who are said to have reached the number of eleven within a year. The brothers lived in the deserted leper colony of Rivo Torto near Assisi; but they spent much of their time traveling through the mountainous districts of Umbria, always cheerful and full of songs, yet making a deep impression on their hearers by their earnest exhortations. Their life was extremely ascetic, though such practices were apparently not prescribed by the first rule which Francis gave them (probably as early as 1209) which seems to have been nothing more than a collection of Scriptural passages emphasizing the duty of poverty.

In spite of some similarities between this principle and some of the fundamental ideas of the followers of Peter Waldo, the brotherhood of Assisi succeeded in gaining the approval of Pope Innocent III. What seems to have impressed first the Bishop of Assisi, Guido, then Cardinal Giovanni di San Paolo and finally Innocent himself, was their utter loyalty to the Catholic Church and the clergy. Innocent III was not only the pope reigning during the life of Francis of Assisi, but he was also responsible for helping to construct the church Francis was being called to rebuild. Innocent III and the Fourth Lateran Council helped maintain the church in Europe. Innocent probably saw in them a possible answer to his desire for an orthodox preaching force to counter heresy. Many legends have clustered around the decisive audience of Francis with the pope. The realistic account in Matthew Paris, according to which the pope originally sent the shabby saint off to keep swine, and only recognized his real worth by his ready obedience, has, in spite of its improbability, a certain historical interest, since it shows the natural antipathy of the older Benedictine monasticism to the plebeian mendicant orders. The group was tonsured and Francis was ordained as a deacon, allowing him to proclaim Gospel passages and preach in churches during Mass.

Francis's last years
Francis had to suffer from the dissensions just alluded to and the transformation they effected in the original constitution of the brotherhood making it a regular order under strict supervision from Rome. Exasperated by the demands of running a growing and fractious Order, Francis asked Pope Honorius III for help in 1219. He was assigned Cardinal Ugolino as protector of the Order by the pope. Francis resigned the day-to-day running of the Order into the hands of others but retained the power to shape the Order's legislation, writing a Rule in 1221 which he revised and had approved in 1223. After about 1221, the day-to-day running of the Order was in the hands of Brother Elias of Cortona, an able friar who would be elected as leader of the friars a few years after Francis's death (1232) but who aroused much opposition because of his autocratic leadership style. He planned and built the Basilica of San Francesco d'Assisi in which Francis of Assisi is buried, a building which includes the friary Sacro Convento, still today the spiritual centre of the Order. 

In the external successes of the brothers, as they were reported at the yearly general chapters, there was much to encourage Francis. , the first German provincial, a zealous advocate of the founder's strict principle of poverty, began in 1221 from Augsburg, with twenty-five companions, to win for the Order the land watered by the Rhine and the Danube. In 1224 Agnellus of Pisa led a small group of friars to England. The branch of the Order arriving in England became known as the "greyfriars". Beginning at Greyfriars at Canterbury, the ecclesiastical capital, they moved on to London, the political capital, and Oxford, the intellectual capital. From these three bases the Franciscans swiftly expanded to embrace the principal towns of England.

Dissensions during Francis's life
The controversy about how to follow the Gospel life of poverty, which extends through the first three centuries of Franciscan history, began in the lifetime of the founder. The ascetic brothers Matthew of Narni and Gregory of Naples, a nephew of Cardinal Ugolino, were the two vicars-general to whom Francis had entrusted the direction of the order during his absence. They carried through at a chapter which they held certain stricter regulations in regard to fasting and the reception of alms, which departed from the spirit of the original rule. It did not take Francis long, on his return, to suppress this insubordinate tendency but he was less successful in regard to another of an opposite nature which soon came up. Elias of Cortona originated a movement for the increase of the worldly consideration of the Order and the adaptation of its system to the plans of the hierarchy which conflicted with the original notions of the founder and helped to bring about the successive changes in the rule already described. Francis was not alone in opposition to this lax and secularizing tendency.

Custody of the Holy Land

After an intense apostolic activity in Italy, in 1219 Francis went to Egypt with the Fifth Crusade to announce the Gospel to the Saracens. He met with the Sultan Malik al-Kamil, initiating a spirit of dialogue and understanding between Christianity and Islam. The Franciscan presence in the Holy Land started in 1217, when the province of Syria was established, with Brother Elias as Minister. By 1229 the friars had a small house near the fifth station of the Via Dolorosa. In 1272 sultan Baibars allowed the Franciscans to settle in the Cenacle on Mount Zion. Later on, in 1309, they also settled in the Holy Sepulchre and in Bethlehem. In 1335 the king of Naples Robert of Anjou and his wife Sancha of Majorca bought the Cenacle and gave it to the Franciscans. Pope Clement VI by the Bulls Gratias agimus and Nuper charissimae (1342) declared the Franciscans as the official custodians of the Holy Places in the name of the Catholic Church.

The Franciscan Custody of the Holy Land is still in force today.

Development after Francis's death

Development to 1239

Elias was a lay friar, and encouraged other laymen to enter the order. This brought opposition from many ordained friars and ministers provincial, who also opposed increased centralization of the Order. Gregory IX declared his intention to build a splendid church to house the body of Francis and the task fell to Elias, who at once began to lay plans for the erection of a great basilica at Assisi, to enshrine the remains of the Poverello. In order to build the basilica, Elias proceeded to collect money in various ways to meet the expenses of the building. Elias thus also alienated the zealots in the order, who felt this was not in keeping with the founder's views upon the question of poverty.

Having protested against the collection of money for the erection of the basilica of San Francesco, it was Leo who broke in pieces the marble box which Elias had set up for offertories for the completion of the basilica at Assisi. For this Elias had him scourged, and this outrage on St Francis's dearest disciple consolidated the opposition to Elias. Leo was the leader in the early stages of the struggle in the order for the maintenance of St Francis's ideas on strict poverty. At the chapter held in May 1227, Elias was rejected in spite of his prominence, and Giovanni Parenti, Minister Provincial of Spain, was elected Minister General of the order.

In 1232 Elias succeeded him, and under him the Order significantly developed its ministries and presence in the towns. Many new houses were founded, especially in Italy, and in many of them special attention was paid to education. The somewhat earlier settlements of Franciscan teachers at the universities (in Paris, for example, where Alexander of Hales was teaching) continued to develop. Contributions toward the promotion of the Order's work, and especially the building of the Basilica in Assisi, came in abundantly. Funds could only be accepted on behalf of the friars for determined, imminent, real necessities that could not be provided for from begging. When in 1230, the General Chapter could not agree on a common interpretation of the 1223 Rule it sent a delegation including Anthony of Padua to Pope Gregory IX for an authentic interpretation of this piece of papal legislation. The bull  of Gregory IX declared that the Testament of St. Francis was not legally binding and offered an interpretation of poverty that would allow the Order to continue to develop. Gregory IX, authorized agents of the Order to have custody of such funds where they could not be spent immediately. Elias pursued with great severity the principal leaders of the opposition, and even Bernardo di Quintavalle, the founder's first disciple, was obliged to conceal himself for years in the forest of Monte Sefro.

The conflict between the two parties lasted many years and the  won several notable victories in spite of the favor shown to their opponents by the papal administration, until finally the reconciliation of the two points of view was seen to be impossible and the order was actually split into halves.

1239–1274

Elias governed the Order from the center, imposing his authority on the provinces (as had Francis). A reaction to this centralized government was led from the provinces of England and Germany. At the general chapter of 1239, held in Rome under the personal presidency of Gregory IX, Elias was deposed in favor of Albert of Pisa, the former provincial of England, a moderate Observantist. This chapter introduced General Statutes to govern the Order and devolved power from the Minister General to the Ministers Provincial sitting in chapter. The next two Ministers General, Haymo of Faversham (1240–44) and Crescentius of Jesi (1244–47), consolidated this greater democracy in the Order but also led the Order towards a greater clericalization. The new Pope Innocent IV supported them in this. In a bull of November 14, 1245, this pope even sanctioned an extension of the system of financial agents, and allowed the funds to be used not simply for those things that were necessary for the friars but also for those that were useful.

The Observantist party took a strong stand in opposition to this ruling and agitated so successfully against the lax General that in 1247, at a chapter held in Lyon, France—where Innocent IV was then residing—he was replaced by the strict Observantist John of Parma (1247–57) and the Order refused to implement any provisions of Innocent IV that were laxer than those of Gregory IX.

Elias, who had been excommunicated and taken under the protection of Frederick II, was now forced to give up all hope of recovering his power in the Order. He died in 1253, after succeeding by recantation in obtaining the removal of his censures. Under John of Parma, who enjoyed the favor of Innocent IV and Pope Alexander IV, the influence of the Order was notably increased, especially by the provisions of the latter pope in regard to the academic activity of the brothers. He not only sanctioned the theological institutes in Franciscan houses, but did all he could to support the friars in the Mendicant Controversy, when the secular Masters of the University of Paris and the Bishops of France combined to attack the mendicant orders. It was due to the action of Alexander IV's envoys, who were obliged to threaten the university authorities with excommunication, that the degree of doctor of theology was finally conceded to the Dominican Thomas Aquinas and the Franciscan Bonaventure (1257), who had previously been able to lecture only as licentiates.

The Franciscan Gerard of Borgo San Donnino at this time issued a Joachimite tract and John of Parma was seen as favoring the condemned theology of Joachim of Fiore. To protect the Order from its enemies, John was forced to step down and recommended Bonaventure as his successor. Bonaventure saw the need to unify the Order around a common ideology and both wrote a new life of the founder and collected the Order's legislation into the Constitutions of Narbonne, so called because they were ratified by the Order at its chapter held at Narbonne, France, in 1260. In the chapter of Pisa three years later Bonaventure's  was approved as the only biography of Francis and all previous biographies were ordered to be destroyed. Bonaventure ruled (1257–74) in a moderate spirit, which is represented also by various works produced by the order in his time—especially by the  written by David of Augsburg soon after 1260.

14th century

1274–1300
The successor to Bonaventure, Jerome of Ascoli or Girolamo Masci (1274–79), (the future Pope Nicholas IV), and his successor, Bonagratia of Bologna (1279–85), also followed a middle course. Severe measures were taken against certain extreme Spirituals who, on the strength of the rumor that Pope Gregory X was intending at the Council of Lyon (1274–75) to force the mendicant orders to tolerate the possession of property, threatened both pope and council with the renunciation of allegiance. Attempts were made, however, to satisfy the reasonable demands of the Spiritual party, as in the bull Exiit qui seminat of Pope Nicholas III (1279), which pronounced the principle of complete poverty to be meritorious and holy, but interpreted it in the way of a somewhat sophistical distinction between possession and usufruct. The bull was received respectfully by Bonagratia and the next two generals, Arlotto of Prato (1285–87) and Matthew of Aqua Sparta (1287–89); but the Spiritual party under the leadership of the Bonaventuran pupil and apocalyptic Pierre Jean Olivi regarded its provisions for the dependence of the friars upon the pope and the division between brothers occupied in manual labor and those employed on spiritual missions as a corruption of the fundamental principles of the Order. They were not won over by the conciliatory attitude of the next general, Raymond Gaufredi (1289–96), and of the Franciscan Pope Nicholas IV (1288–92). The attempt made by the next pope, Celestine V, an old friend of the order, to end the strife by uniting the Observantist party with his own order of hermits (see Celestines) was scarcely more successful. Only a part of the Spirituals joined the new order, and the secession scarcely lasted beyond the reign of the hermit-pope. Pope Boniface VIII annulled Celestine's bull of foundation with his other acts, deposed the general Raymond Gaufredi, and appointed a man of laxer tendency, John de Murro, in his place. The Benedictine section of the Celestines was separated from the Franciscan section, and the latter was formally suppressed by Pope Boniface VIII in 1302. The leader of the Observantists, Olivi, who spent his last years in the Franciscan house at Tarnius and died there in 1298, had pronounced against the extremer "Spiritual" attitude, and given an exposition of the theory of poverty which was approved by the more moderate Observantists, and for a long time constituted their principle.

Persecution
Under Pope Clement V (1305–14) this party succeeded in exercising some influence on papal decisions. In 1309 Clement had a commission sit at Avignon for the purpose of reconciling the conflicting parties. Ubertino of Casale, the leader, after Olivi's death, of the stricter party, who was a member of the commission, induced the Council of Vienne to arrive at a decision in the main favoring his views, and the papal constitution  (1313) was on the whole conceived in the same sense. Clement's successor, Pope John XXII (1316–34), favored the laxer or conventual party. By the bull  he modified several provisions of the constitution , and required the formal submission of the Spirituals. Some of them, encouraged by the strongly Observantist general Michael of Cesena, ventured to dispute the pope's right so to deal with the provisions of his predecessor. Sixty-four of them were summoned to Avignon and the most obstinate delivered over to the Inquisition, four of them being burned (1318). Shortly before this all the separate houses of the Observantists had been suppressed.

Renewed controversy on the question of poverty

A few years later a new controversy, this time theoretical, broke out on the question of poverty. In his 14 August 1279 bull , Pope Nicholas III had confirmed the arrangement already established by Pope Innocent IV, by which all property given to the Franciscans was vested in the Holy See, which granted the friars the mere use of it. The bull declared that renunciation of ownership of all things "both individually but also in common, for God's sake, is meritorious and holy; Christ, also, showing the way of perfection, taught it by word and confirmed it by example, and the first founders of the church militant, as they had drawn it from the fountainhead itself, distributed it through the channels of their teaching and life to those wishing to live perfectly."

Although Exiit qui seminat banned disputing about its contents, the decades that followed saw increasingly bitter disputes about the form of poverty to be observed by Franciscans, with the Spirituals (so called because associated with the Age of the Spirit that Joachim of Fiore had said would begin in 1260) pitched against the Conventual Franciscans. Pope Clement V's bull  of 20 November 1312 failed to effect a compromise between the two factions. Clement V's successor, Pope John XXII was determined to suppress what he considered to be the excesses of the Spirituals, who contended eagerly for the view that Christ and his apostles had possessed absolutely nothing, either separately or jointly, and who were citing  in support of their view. In 1317, John XXII formally condemned the group of them known as the Fraticelli. The experts disagreed among themselves, but the majority condemned the idea on the grounds that it would condemn the church's right to have possessions. By the bull  of 8 December 1322, John XXII, declaring it ridiculous to pretend that every scrap of food given to the friars and eaten by them belonged to the pope, refused to accept ownership over the goods of the Franciscans in the future and granted them exemption from the rule that absolutely forbade ownership of anything even in common, thus forcing them to accept ownership. And, on 12 November 1323, he issued the short bull  which declared "erroneous and heretical" the doctrine that Christ and his apostles had no possessions whatever. John XXII's actions thus demolished the fictitious structure that gave the appearance of absolute poverty to the life of the Franciscan friars.

Influential members of the order protested, such as the minister general Michael of Cesena, the English provincial William of Ockham, and Bonagratia of Bergamo. In 1324, Louis the Bavarian sided with the Spirituals and accused the pope of heresy. In reply to the argument of his opponents that Nicholas III's bull  was fixed and irrevocable, John XXII issued the bull  on 10 November 1324 in which he declared that it cannot be inferred from the words of the 1279 bull that Christ and the apostles had nothing, adding: "Indeed, it can be inferred rather that the Gospel life lived by Christ and the Apostles did not exclude some possessions in common, since living 'without property' does not require that those living thus should have nothing in common." In 1328, Michael of Cesena was summoned to Avignon to explain the Order's intransigence in refusing the pope's orders and its complicity with Louis of Bavaria. Michael was imprisoned in Avignon, together with Francesco d'Ascoli, Bonagratia, and William of Ockham. In January of that year Louis of Bavaria entered Rome and had himself crowned emperor. Three months later he declared John XXII deposed and installed the Spiritual Franciscan Pietro Rainalducci as antipope. The Franciscan chapter that opened in Bologna on 28 May reelected Michael of Cesena, who two days before had escaped with his companions from Avignon. But in August Louis the Bavarian and his pope had to flee Rome before an attack by Robert, King of Naples. Only a small part of the Franciscan Order joined the opponents of John XXII, and at a general chapter held in Paris in 1329 the majority of all the houses declared their submission to the Pope. In 1330, Antipope Nicholas V submitted, followed later by the ex-general Michael, and finally, just before his death, by Ockham.

Separate congregations

Out of all these dissensions in the 14th century sprang a number of separate congregations, or almost sects, to say nothing of the heretical parties of the Beghards and Fraticelli, some of which developed within the Order on both hermit and cenobitic principles and may here be mentioned:

Clareni
The Clareni or Clarenini was an association of hermits established on the river Clareno in the march of Ancona by Angelo da Clareno (1337). Like several other smaller congregations, it was obliged in 1568 under Pope Pius V to unite with the general body of Observantists.

Minorites of Narbonne
As a separate congregation, this originated through the union of a number of houses which followed Olivi after 1308. It was limited to southwestern France and, its members being accused of the heresy of the Beghards, was suppressed by the Inquisition during the controversies under John XXII.

Reform of Johannes de Vallibus

This was founded in the hermitage of St. Bartholomew at Brugliano near Foligno in 1334. The congregation was suppressed by the Franciscan general chapter in 1354; reestablished in 1368 by Paolo de' Trinci of Foligno; confirmed by Gregory XI in 1373, and spread rapidly from Central Italy to France, Spain, Hungary, and elsewhere. Most of the Observantist houses joined this congregation by degrees, so that it became known simply as the "brothers of the regular Observance." It acquired the favor of the popes by its energetic opposition to the heretical Fraticelli, and was expressly recognized by the Council of Constance (1415). It was allowed to have a special vicar-general of its own and legislate for its members without reference to the conventual part of the Order. Through the work of such men as Bernardino of Siena, Giovanni da Capistrano, and Dietrich Coelde (b. 1435? at Munster; was a member of the Brethren of the Common Life, died December 11, 1515), it gained great prominence during the 15th century. By the end of the Middle Ages, the Observantists, with 1,400 houses, comprised nearly half of the entire Order. Their influence brought about attempts at reform even among the Conventuals, including the quasi-Observantist brothers living under the rule of the Conventual ministers (Martinianists or Observantes sub ministris), such as the male Colletans, later led by Boniface de Ceva in his reform attempts principally in France and Germany; the reformed congregation founded in 1426 by the Spaniard Philip de Berbegal and distinguished by the special importance they attached to the little hood; the Neutri, a group of reformers originating about 1463 in Italy, who tried to take a middle ground between the Conventuals and Observantists, but refused to obey the heads of either, until they were compelled by the pope to affiliate with the regular Observantists, or with those of the Common Life; the Caperolani, a congregation founded about 1470 in North Italy by Peter Caperolo, but dissolved again on the death of its founder in 1481; the Amadeists, founded by the noble Portuguese Amadeo, who entered the Franciscan order at Assisi in 1452, gathered around him a number of adherents to his fairly strict principles (numbering finally twenty-six houses), and died in the odor of sanctity in 1482.

Unification

Projects for a union between the two main branches of the Order were put forth not only by the Council of Constance but by several popes, without any positive result. By direction of Pope Martin V, John of Capistrano drew up statutes which were to serve as a basis for reunion, and they were actually accepted by a general chapter at Assisi in 1430; but the majority of the Conventual houses refused to agree to them, and they remained without effect. At John of Capistrano's request Eugene IV issued a bull (1446) aimed at the same result, but again nothing was accomplished. Equally unsuccessful were the attempts of the Franciscan Pope Sixtus IV, who bestowed a vast number of privileges on both of the original mendicant orders, but by this very fact lost the favor of the Observants and failed in his plans for reunion. Julius II succeeded in reducing some of the smaller branches, but left the division of the two great parties untouched. This division was finally legalized by Leo X, after a general chapter held in Rome in 1517, in connection with the reform-movement of the Fifth Lateran Council, had once more declared the impossibility of reunion. The less strict principles of the Conventuals, permitting the possession of real estate and the enjoyment of fixed revenues, were recognized as tolerable, while the Observants, in contrast to this , were held strictly to their own  or pauper.

All of the groups that followed the Franciscan Rule literally were united to the Observants, and the right to elect the Minister General of the Order, together with the seal of the Order, was given to this united grouping. This grouping, since it adhered more closely to the rule of the founder, was allowed to claim a certain superiority over the Conventuals. The Observant general (elected now for six years, not for life) inherited the title of "Minister-General of the Whole Order of St. Francis" and was granted the right to confirm the choice of a head for the Conventuals, who was known as "Master-General of the Friars Minor Conventual"—although this privilege never became practically operative.

New World missions

.
The work of the Franciscans in New Spain began in 1523, when three Flemish friars—Juan de Ayora, Pedro de Tecto, and Pedro de Gante—reached the central highlands. Their impact as missionaries was limited at first, since two of them died on Cortés's expedition to Central American in 1524, but Fray Pedro de Gante initiated the evangelization process and studied the Nahuatl language through his contacts with children of the Indian elite from the city of Tetzcoco. Later, in May 1524, with the arrival of the Twelve Apostles of Mexico, led by Martín de Valencia.  There they built the Convento Grande de San Francisco, which became Franciscan headquarters for New Spain for the next three hundred years.

Franciscans and the Inquisition

About 1236, Pope Gregory IX appointed the Franciscans, along with the Dominicans, as Inquisitors. The Franciscans had been involved in anti-heretical activities from the beginning simply by preaching and acting as living examples of the Gospel life. As official Inquisitors, they were authorized to use torture to extract confessions, as approved by Pope Innocent IV in 1252. The Franciscans were involved in the torture and trials of heretics and witches throughout the Middle Ages and wrote their own manuals to guide Inquisitors, such as the 14th century Codex Casanatensis for use by Inquisitors in Tuscany.

Contemporary organizations

First Order

Order of Friars Minor

In 1897, Pope Leo XIII combined the Observants, Discalced (Alcantarines), Recollects, and Riformati into one order under general constitutions. While the Capuchins and Conventuals wanted the reunited Observants to be referred to as The Order of Friars Minor of the Leonine Union, they were instead called simply the Order of Friars Minor. Despite the tensions caused by this forced union the Order grew from 1897 to reach a peak of 26,000 members in the 1960s before declining after the 1970s. The Order is headed by a Minister General, who since May 2013 is Father Michael Anthony Perry.

Order of Friars Minor Conventual
The Order of Friars Minor Conventual (OFM Conv.) consists of 290 houses worldwide with a total of almost 5000 friars. They have experienced growth in this century throughout the world. They are located in Italy, the United States, Canada, Australia, and throughout Latin America, and Africa. They are the largest in number in Poland because of the work and inspiration of Maximilian Kolbe.

Order of Friars Minor Capuchin

The Order of Friars Minor Capuchin (OFM Cap.) are the youngest branch of Franciscans, founded in 1525 by Matteo Serafini (Matteo Bassi, Matteo da Bascio), an Observant friar, who felt himself called to an even stricter observance of Franciscan austerity. With the support of the Papal Court, the new branch received early recognition and grew fast, first in Italy and after 1574 all over Europe and throughout the world. The Capuchins eventually became a separate order in 1619. The order now exists in 106 countries all over the world, with around 10,500 brothers living in more than 1700 communities known as fraternities or friaries.

Second Order

Poor Clares

The Poor Clares, officially the Order of Saint Clare, are members of a contemplative order of nuns in the Catholic Church. The Poor Clares were the second Franciscan order to be established. Founded by Clare of Assisi and Francis of Assisi on Palm Sunday in the year 1212, they were organized after the Order of Friars Minor (the first order), and before the Third Order of Saint Francis. As of 2011 there were over 20,000 Poor Clare nuns in over 75 countries throughout the world. They follow several different observances and are organized into federations.

The Poor Clares follow the Rule of St. Clare which was approved by Pope Innocent IV the day before Clare's death in 1253. The main branch of the Order (OSC) follows the observance of Pope Urban. Other branches established since that time, who operate under their own unique constitutions, are the Colettine Poor Clares (PCC – founded 1410), the Capuchin Poor Clares (OSC Cap. – founded 1538), and the Poor Clares of Perpetual Adoration (PCPA – founded 1854).

Third Order

The Third Order of Saint Francis comprises people who desired to grow in holiness in their daily lives without entering monastic life. After founding the Friars Minor and seeing a need, Francis created a way of life to which married men and women, as well as the single and the secular clergy, could belong and live according to the Gospel.

Secular Franciscan Order
The Secular Franciscan Order, prior to 1978 also known as the Third Order Secular of Saint Francis, is an order founded by Francis in 1212 for brothers and sisters who do not live in a religious community. Members of the order continue to live secular lives, however they do gather regularly for fraternal activities. In the United States alone there are 17,000 professed members of the order. Members of the Order live according to a Rule composed by St Francis in 1221. The Rule was slightly modified through the centuries and was replaced at the turn of the 20th century by Pope Leo XIII, himself a member of the Order. A new and current Rule was approved by Pope Paul VI in 1978, and the Third Order was renamed the Secular Franciscan Order. It is an international organization with its own Minister General based in Rome.

Third Order Regular

Within a century of the death of Francis, members of the Third Order began to live in common, in an attempt to follow a more ascetical way of life. Angela of Foligno (+1309) was foremost among those who achieved great depths in their lives of prayer and service of the poor, while living in community with other women of the Order.

Among the men, the Third Order Regular of St. Francis of Penance was formed in 1447 by a papal decree that united several communities of hermits following the Third Order Rule into a single Order with its own Minister General. Today it is an international community of friars who desire to emphasize the works of mercy and on-going conversion. The community is also known as the Franciscan Friars, TOR, and they strive to "rebuild the Church" in areas of high school and college education, parish ministry, church renewal, social justice, campus ministry, hospital chaplaincies, foreign missions, and other ministries in places where the church is needed. The association of Franciscans (Grey Friars) with education becomes a stock fictional reference in (for example) the works of  Thackeray ("Grey Friars School" in Pendennis and The Newcomes) or of  "Frank Richards" (Greyfriars School of Billy Bunter fame).

After the formal recognition of the members of religious tertiary communities, the following centuries saw a steady growth of such communities across Europe. Initially, the women's communities took a monastic form of life, either voluntarily or under pressure from ecclesiastical superiors. The great figure of this development was Hyacintha Mariscotti. As Europe entered the upheavals of the modern age, new communities arose which were able to focus more exclusively on social service, especially during the immediate post-Napoleonic period which devastated much of Western Europe. An example of this is Mary Frances Schervier (1819–1876).

Third Order Regular in North America
This movement continued in North America as various congregations arose from one coast to another, in answer to the needs of the large emigrant communities that were flooding the cities of the United States and Canada.

The Third Order Regular of the Brothers of the Poor of St. Francis of Assisi, CFP, are an active community, based in the United States, with houses in Belgium, The Netherlands, Germany, and Brazil. These Franciscans strive to live an integrated life through prayer, community, and ministry to the poor, neglected and disadvantaged youth, the powerless, people in need, and the elderly. The Brothers of the Poor live by their vows of poverty (living a simple lifestyle), consecrated chastity (loving all, possessing no one, striving sincerely, for singleness of heart, a celibate way of loving and being loved), and obedience (to God, to the community, to the church, and to self). The Brothers of the Poor also serve persons with AIDS and people who ask for help, regardless of their religion or their social/economic background. They are teachers, childcare workers, social workers, counselors, pastoral ministers, retreat ministers, religious educators, and school administrators, along with other tasks.

The Regular Tertiaries, officially the Third Order Regular of St. Francis of Penance, who operate the Franciscan University of Steubenville, follow a rule approved by Pope Leo X. Today this group is present in 17 countries: Italy, Croatia, Spain, France, Germany, Austria, USA, India, Sri Lanka, South Africa, Brazil, Paraguay, Mexico, Peru, Sweden, Bangladesh, and the Philippines.

Brothers and Sisters of Penance of St. Francis 

The Brothers and Sisters of Penance of St. Francis, is a private confraternity of the Roman Catholic Church whose members strive to model their lives according to the Rule and Statutes of the Primitive Rule of the Third Order of St. Francis, which was written for lay people in 1221 by Francis of Assisi. Right now there are several hundred members within the United States and a few hundred more throughout the world. The order was originally started in 1996 by members of the Archdiocese of St. Paul in Minnesota.

Other tertiaries
 In 1435, Francis of Paola founded the "Poor Hermits of Saint Francis of Assisi", later known as the "Hermits of the Order of Minims", and then renamed the "Order of Minims" in 1506 by Pope Julius II. There are mendicant friars, contemplative nuns, and lay tertiaries.
 The Society of the Atonement, also known as Graymoor Friars and Graymoor Sisters, started in 1898 as a religious community in the Episcopal Church, and came into union with the Holy See in 1909.
 The Franciscan Friars of the Immaculate started in 1970, and became an institute with Pontifical Right in 1998. In that same year, the Franciscan Sisters of the Immaculate also became an institute with Pontifical Right. There are also Third Order Franciscan Sisters of the Immaculate, an offshoot of the Franciscan Tertiaries of the Immaculate.

Other Franciscan organizations

 The Community of the Franciscan Friars of the Renewal started in 1987, and the Franciscan Sisters of the Renewal in 1988.
 The Franciscan Missionaries of the Eternal Word started in 1987, and are now a Public Clerical Association of the Faithful.
 Franciscans International is a Non-governmental organization (NGO) with General Consultative status at the United Nations, uniting the voices of Franciscan brothers and sisters from around the world. It operates under the sponsorship of the Conference of the Franciscan Family (CFF) and serves all Franciscans and the global community by bringing grassroots Franciscans to the United Nations forums in New York City and Geneva. It brings the spiritual and ethical values of the Franciscans to the United Nations and international organisations.

Other Christian traditions

One of the results of the Oxford Movement in the Anglican Church during the 19th century was the re-establishment of religious orders, including some of Franciscan inspiration. The principal Anglican communities in the Franciscan tradition are the Community of St. Francis (women, founded 1905) (CSF), the Poor Clares of Reparation (PCR), the Society of Saint Francis (men, founded 1934)(SSF), the Community of St. Clare (women, enclosed) (OSC), and the Order of St. Francis (men, founded in 2003). There is also a Third Order known as the Third Order Society of St Francis (TSSF), and the Lesser Franciscans.

There is also an order of Sisters of St. Clare in the Puget Sound area of Washington state (Diocese of Olympia), the Little Sisters of St. Clare.

There are further some small Franciscan communities within European Protestantism and the Old Catholic Church. There are some Franciscan orders in Lutheran Churches, including the Order of Lutheran Franciscans, the Evangelical Sisterhood of Mary, and the Evangelische Kanaan Franziskus-Bruderschaft (Kanaan Franciscan Brothers).

In addition, there are associations of Franciscan inspiration not connected with a mainstream Christian tradition and describing themselves as ecumenical or dispersed.  The Companions of Francis Apostolic Religious Institute (CFARI), with its roots in independent Catholicism and Anglicanism, is a dispersed, egalitarian and ecumenical order of Franciscans based in Pasadena, California, with vowed members in California,  Arizona and New Mexico.  CFARI members live among the populations they serve and are self supporting in their ministry.

Distinguishing characteristics

Spirituality
Franciscan theology conforms to broader doctrine with the Catholic Church, but involves several unique emphases. Franciscan theologians view creation, the natural world, as good and joyous, and avoid dwelling on the "stain of original sin." Francis expressed great affection towards animals and inanimate natural objects as fellow inhabitants of God's creation, in his work Canticle of the Creatures (also known as the Canticle of the Sun). Special emphasis is put on the Incarnation of Christ viewed as a special act of humility, as Francis was struck by God's great charity in sacrificing his son for our salvation; they also exhibit great devotion to the Eucharist. The Rule of Saint Francis calls for members to practice simple living and detachment from material possessions in emulation of Jesus' life and earthly ministry. The simple lifestyle helps members of the order, in whichever branch, to experience solidarity with the poor and to work for social justice. Franciscan spirituality also strongly emphasizes working to preserve the church, and remain loyal to it.

Visions and stigmata

Among Catholic religious, Franciscans have proportionally reported higher ratios of stigmata and have claimed proportionally higher ratios of visions of Jesus and Mary. Francis of Assisi himself was one of the first reported cases of stigmata, and perhaps the most famous stigmatic of modern times is Padre Pio, a Capuchin, who also reported visions of Jesus and Mary. Pio's stigmata persisted for over fifty years and he was examined by numerous physicians in the 20th century, who confirmed the existence of the wounds, but none of whom could produce a medical explanation for the fact that his bleeding wounds would never get infected. According to the Encyclopaedia Britannica, his wounds healed once, but reappeared. According to the Columbia Encyclopedia some medical authorities who examined Padre Pio's wounds were inclined to believe that the stigmata were connected with nervous or cataleptic hysteria. According to Answers.com the wounds were examined by Luigi Romanelli, chief physician of the City Hospital of Barletta, for about one year; Giorgio Festa, a private practitioner who examined them in 1920 and 1925; Giuseppe Bastianelli, a physician to Pope Benedict XV, who agreed that the wounds existed but made no other comment; and pathologist Amico Bignami who also observed the wounds but made no diagnosis.

Contributions to biblical scholarship

The Franciscans established the Studium Biblicum Franciscanum as an academic society based in Jerusalem and Hong Kong for the study of scripture. The Hong Kong branch founded by Gabriele Allegra produced the first complete translation of the Catholic Bible in Chinese in 1968 after a 40-year effort. The Studium Biblicum Translation is often considered the authoritative Chinese Bible among Catholics.

The early efforts of another Franciscan, namely Giovanni di Monte Corvino who had attempted a first translation of the Bible in Beijing in the 14th century, provided the initial spark for Gabriele Allegra's 40 year undertaking, when at the age of 21 he happened to attend the 6th centenary celebration for Monte Corvino.

Notable members

The Franciscan order boasts a number of distinguished members. From its first century can be cited the three great scholastics Alexander of Hales, Bonaventure, and John Duns Scotus, the "Doctor of Wonders" Roger Bacon, and the well-known mystic authors and popular preachers David of Augsburg and Berthold of Regensburg.

During the Middle Ages noteworthy members included Nicholas of Lyra, Biblical commentator Bernardino of Siena, philosopher William of Ockham, preachers John of Capistrano, Oliver Maillard, and Michel Menot, and historians Luke Wadding and Antoine Pagi.

In the field of Christian art during the later Middle Ages, the Franciscan movement exercised considerable influence, especially in Italy. The influence of Franciscan ideals shows in several great painters of the 13th and 14th centuries, especially Cimabue and Giotto, who, though they were not friars, were spiritual sons of Francis in the wider sense; it is also seen in the plastic masterpieces of the latter, as well as the architectural conceptions of both himself and his school. The Italian Gothic style, whose earliest important monument is the great convent church at Assisi (built 1228–53), was cultivated as a rule principally by members of the order or men under their influence.

The early spiritual poetry of Italy was partially inspired by Francis himself, who was followed by Thomas of Celano, Bonaventure, and Jacopone da Todi. Through a tradition which held him to have been a member of the Franciscan Third Order, even Dante may be included within this artistic tradition (cf. especially Paradiso, xi. 50).

Other famous members of the Franciscan family include Anthony of Padua, François Rabelais, Alexander of Hales, Giovanni da Pian del Carpini, Pio of Pietrelcina, Maximilian Kolbe, Pasquale Sarullo, Mamerto Esquiú, Gabriele Allegra, Junipero Serra, Simpliciano of the Nativity, Mychal F. Judge, Angelico Chavez, Anton Docher, Joseph of Cupertino, Benedict Groeschel and Leonard of Port Maurice.

During the "spiritual conquest" of New Spain, 1523–1572, the arrival of the first group of Franciscans, the Twelve Apostles of Mexico, included Martín de Valencia, but more prominently for his corpus of writings on the earliest years was Toribio de Benavente Motolinia. Other important Franciscans are Alonso de Molina, Andrés de Olmos, and Bernardino de Sahagún, who all created texts in indigenous language of Nahuatl to aid friars in the evangelization of Mexico. Geronimo de Mendieta, Augustin de Vetancourt, and Juan de Torquemada are important contributors to the history of the Franciscans in central Mexico.

A modern notable member includes Father Casey Cole, O.F.M., an American Franciscan friar, Catholic priest, writer, and blogger. Cole runs his own online blog and YouTube channel called Breaking in the Habit and is the author of the books Let Go: Seven Stumbling Blocks to Christian Discipleship and Called: What Happens After Saying Yes to God.

See also
 Association of Franciscan Colleges and Universities
 List of Ministers General of the Order of Friars Minor
 Maria Antonio of Vicenza
 List of Franciscan saints

References

Notes

Sources
Books
 
 
 
 
 
 
 
 
 
 
 
 
 —4 volumes

 
 
 
 
 
 
 
 
 —Shows how Franciscans shifted away from an early emphasis on poverty and humility and instead emphasized educational roles
 
 
 

Articles

External links

First Order
 Order of Friars Minor (Official website)
 Order of Friars Minor Capuchin (Official website)
 Order of Friars Minor Conventual (Official website)

Second Order 
 Order of Saint Clare (Official website)

Third Order
 Secular Franciscan Order  (Official website)
 Third Order Regular of St. Francis of Penance (Official website)

Research resources
 Online guide to the Academy of American Franciscan History Microfilm Collection, 1526–1972, The Bancroft Library
 Franciscan authors, 13th – 18th century
 Digital Franciscans – extensive list of Franciscan internet resources
 Luke Wadding Papers: correspondence relating to Fr Luke Wadding OFM and the Irish Friars Minor at St. Isidore's College, Rome, on ecclesiastical and political matters; and concerning his interests as historian of the Franciscan Order. A UCD Digital Library Collection.
 Lewis E 253 Manuscript of an evangelist and prebendary of the minor orders at OPenn
 Lewis E 258 Life of Holy Francis and his companions at OPenn
 14 Regulae ordinis fratrum minorum Franciscani etc. at OPenn
 Franciscan Society Collection at University College London

Media
 Greyfriars and Blackfriars, BBC Radio 4 discussion with Henrietta Leyser, Anthony Kenny & Alexander Murray (In Our Time, November 10, 2005)

 
 
Christian religious orders established in the 13th century
1209 establishments in Europe
13th-century Catholicism
Catholicism in the Middle Ages